Pīters Aloizs Ragaušs (born in 1957) is a businessman born in the U.S. state of Michigan.

He is a member of the board of Friends of the University of Latvia and the Baltic-American Freedom Foundation. He was also the Honorary Consul of Latvia in Texas in 2018.

Wealth and philanthropy 
Ragaušs is part of the circle of patrons of The University of Latvia "Ceļamaize" Scholarship from 2019 to 2020.

References 

American people of Latvian descent
American businesspeople
Living people
1957 births